The Walter Mikron is a four-cylinder, air-cooled, inverted straight engine for aircraft.

Development
Developed in Czechoslovakia in the early 1930s, the engine saw limited use in late 1930s and early 1950s. In the 1980s an initial batch of engines was rebuilt by Aerotechnik Moravska Trebova for use on L-13 Vivat motorgliders. Production of new engines followed. The company Aerotechnik was later bought by Parma Technik and production resumed in 1999, under a new name, in the same factory. The engine is mostly used on ultralight, LSA and experimental aircraft.
The production is about 20-30 engines annually. (2014)

Variants
Mikron I
Initial production engines .
16 engines made in 1935.

Mikron II
After a hiatus in production during the Second World War, production resumed till 1948, when the Micron III went into production. In total 421 Mikron II engines were produced.

Mikron III
Introduced in 1945, 103 engines made between 1948-1950. The engines were used on Praga E-114 Air Baby.

Mikron IIIS
In 1980s company Aerotechnik in Moravska Trebova had collected 56(!) engines of the post war production.
The engines have been rebuilt, new pistons and carburetor JIKOV SOP 40L installed.
Used on L-13 Vivat motorgliders.

Mikron IIIA
Engines produced by Aerotechnik in 1980s-90s. Updated cylinder head with one more cooling rib, updated connecting rod lower end, otherwise identical with IIIS.

Mikron IIIB
Almost identical with IIIA except the compression ratio.  The engine initially used lowered A heads. After some problems with cracking, new B heads were developed by Parma Technik.

Mikron M IIISE, AE, BE
Engines equipped with electric starter and alternator.

Mikron IIIC
Version developed by Parma Technik for ULL and experimental aeroplanes.

Applications

Specifications (Mikron II)

See also

References

 Gunston, Bill. World Encyclopedia of Aero Engines. Cambridge, England. Patrick Stephens Limited, 1989.

External links

Oldengine.org

Aircraft air-cooled inline piston engines
1930s aircraft piston engines
Inverted aircraft piston engines
Mikron